The Eighth and Ninth Circuits Act of 1837 was a federal statute which increased the size of the Supreme Court of the United States from seven justices to nine, and which also reorganized the circuit courts of the federal judiciary. The newly created Eighth and Ninth circuits were designed to alleviate the judicial needs of newly-created western states. The Act became law on March 3, 1837, at the end of the Jackson administration.

History 

The period from 1834-1838 saw a major shakeup in the Court.  During this period, Chief Justice John Marshall died and was replaced by Roger B. Taney, Associate Justice William Johnson died and was replaced by James Moore Wayne, and Associate Justice Gabriel Duvall resigned, being replaced by Philip P. Barbour.  Further, the 1837 Act came into effect shortly after these replacements. John Catron and John McKinley were the first justices appointed to these newly created seats.

References

1837 in American law
United States federal judiciary legislation
History of the Supreme Court of the United States
24th United States Congress